Ernest Henry Nunn (23 September 1904 – 11 September 1991) was an Australian rules footballer who played with Footscray and Collingwood in the Victorian Football League (VFL).

Notes

External links 

Ernie Nunn's profile at Collingwood Forever

1904 births
1991 deaths
Australian rules footballers from Victoria (Australia)
Western Bulldogs players
Collingwood Football Club players